Beth Lisick (born December 13, 1968 in Saratoga, California) is an American writer, performer, and author of six books. With Arline Klatte, she co-founded the Porchlight Storytelling Series of spoken word performances in San Francisco in 2002. Her spoken word performances were featured at the Lollapalooza festival, the South by Southwest Music Festival, Bumbershoot, and Lilith Fair. She has toured with Sister Spit. She has also performed sketch comedy with the group White Noise Radio Theatre at SF Sketchfest and has an ongoing film and stage collaboration with Tara Jepsen. The pair wrote and acted in an original web series entitled "Rods and Cones", which was named one of Indiewire's 25 Best Series/Creators of 2014.

In 2009, she appeared in the film Everything Strange and New, directed by award-winning American filmmaker Frazer Bradshaw. The film screened at numerous festivals including Sundance Film Festival, Munich Film Festival, Karlovy Vary International Film Festival, and the San Francisco International Film Festival, where it won the FIPRESCI Award.

In 2011, she received a grant from the Creative Work Fund to collaborate on a book project with Creativity Explored. The result is a ten-part series of chapbooks entitled Tell You What.

Lisick is married to recording engineer and producer Eli Crews. Together they have one child, Gus.

Bibliography 

Monkey Girl, Manic D Press (1997) 
This Too Can Be Yours, Manic D Press (2001) 
Everybody Into the Pool: True Tales, HarperCollins/ReganBooks (2005) 
Helping Me Help Myself: One Skeptic, Ten Self-Help Gurus, and a Year on the Brink of the Comfort Zone (2008) 
Yokohama Threeway (2013) 
Edie on the Green Screen (2020) 

Anthologies

 Santa Cruz Noir, Akashic. Susie Bright, ed. (2018) 
 Yes Is the Answer, Rare Bird Books. Marc Weingarten, Tyson Cornell, eds. 
 The Speed Chronicles, Akashic. Joseph Mattson, ed. (2011) 
 The Post-It Note Diaries. Arthur Jones, illustrator.(2011) 
 Best American Poetry. James Tate, ed. (1997)

Filmography

References

External links

American women short story writers
American film actresses
American spoken word poets
Living people
American short story writers
1968 births
People from Saratoga, California
21st-century American poets
21st-century American actresses